Coyote Wash is a tributary stream of Railroad Wash, in Greenlee County, Arizona.

References

Coyote Wash (Whiskey Creek)
Rivers of Arizona